Roy Wilhelm Hellvin (born 9 January 1944 in Oslo, Norway) is a Norwegian pianist, composer, and music arranger, known from Oslo's theater and jazz scenes and from a series of recordings.

Biography 
Hellvin early (1961) led his own band, and with Lucky Thompson, Carl Magnus Neumann, and Jesper Thilo, he attended the 1968 Kongsberg Jazzfestival. He released his debut solo album Roy Hellvin in 1975. Furthermore, he played with Bernt Anker Steen / Harald Bergersen Quintet, and was a part of 'Radiostorbandet' (1968–81) and collaborated on releases by Laila Dalseth (1976–80.

Hellvin has musical education from the Norwegian Academy of Music and the University of Oslo, and has been employee at Oslo Nye Teater (1976) as musical director and arranger for more than 60 productions. In addition he has collaborated on productions for Nationaltheatret, Det norske teatret, Riksteatret, Trøndelag Teater, Rogaland Teater, and Chat Noir. In the 1980s he played with Per Nyhaug Studioband as well as in lineups with Frode Thingnæs.

He leads his own Roy Hellvin Trio including Bjørn Jacobsen (bass) and Leif Osen (drums), releasing the album Old Friends in 2003). More recently, he has led a quartet with the same Osen, and Terje Johansen (trumpet) and Kåre Garnes (bass). Hellvin was awarded the 2001 Gammleng-prisen in the category Studio.

Honors 
2001: Gammleng-prisen in the category Studio

Discography

Solo albums 
 1975: Roy Hellvin (Philips)

 With Roy Hellvin Trio
 2002: Old Friends (Curling Legs

Collaborations 
 With Erik Amundsen
 1956: Erik Amundsen (Gemini Records)

 With Bjarne Nerem
 1962: Portrait Of A Norwegian Jazz Artist (Gemini Records)

 With Erik Andresen
 1970: Gip (Flower)

 With Laila Dalseth
 1978: Glad There Is You (Talent)

 With Per Nyhaug Studioband
 1984: Groovin' High (Gemini Records)

 With Helge Hurum
 2007: Spectre: The Unreleased Works 1971-1982 (Plastic Strip)

 With Erling Wicklund
 2007: Storeslem (Ponca Jazz Records), live at Lancelot

References

External links 
 Biography at JazzBasen

20th-century Norwegian pianists
21st-century Norwegian pianists
Norwegian jazz pianists
Norwegian jazz composers
Curling Legs artists
Norwegian Academy of Music alumni
University of Oslo alumni
Musicians from Oslo
1944 births
Living people